Marco Quinto Vigerio della Rovere (died 1560) was a Roman Catholic prelate who served as Bishop of Senigallia (1513–1560).

Biography
On 9 May 1513, Marco Quinto Vigerio della Rovere was appointed during the papacy of Pope Leo X as Bishop of Senigallia.
He served as Bishop of Senigallia until his death in 1560.

References

External links and additional sources
 (for Chronology of Bishops) 
 (for Chronology of Bishops) 

16th-century Italian Roman Catholic bishops
Bishops appointed by Pope Leo X
1560 deaths
Della Rovere family